The Rovuma Plate or Rovuma microplate is one of the four tectonic microplates that, together with the larger Nubian Plate, form the African Plate. The other three are the Somali Plate, the Lwandle Plate and the Victoria Plate.

References

Tectonic plates